Maron is an American comedy television series created by and starring Marc Maron. The series premiered on the American cable television network IFC on May 3, 2013. Maron was renewed by IFC for a 13-episode fourth and final season which premiered on May 4, 2016, and concluded on July 13, 2016.

Series overview
{| class="wikitable plainrowheaders" style="text-align:center;"
|-
! colspan="2" rowspan="2" |Season
! rowspan="2" |Episodes
! colspan="2" |Originally aired
|-
! First aired
! Last aired
|-
|style="background: #1034A6;"|
| 1
| 10
| 
| 
|-
|style="background: #8DB600;"|
| 2
| 13
| 
| 
|-
| style="background:#ff0;"|
| 3
| 13
| 
| 
|-
|style="background: #FB9B0D;"|
| 4
| 13
| 
| 
|}

Episodes

Season 1 (2013)

Season 2 (2014)

Season 3 (2015)

Season 4 (2016)

References

External links
 

Lists of comedy television series episodes